The Rallye de Nouvelle-Calédonie is a rally racing event held in the French island of New Caledonia. The rally dates back as far as 1967 and was known then as the New Caledonia Safari. That first rally was won by Australian driver John Keran driving a Volvo 122S. The rally was promoted to international status as a round of the Asia Pacific Rally Championship (APRC) in 1999. In 2000 the rally was dropped from the APRC but returned in 2001 and has been part of the regional championship ever since, although the 2003 event was abandoned due to heavy rain.

The event is known for its treacherous conditions as when wet the forest roads turn to mud quickly and it quite steep as it climbs the volcanic spine of the island. With its strong French culture the island rally has a different atmosphere from the East Asian and Australasian legs of the APRC. Entrants are an odd mix of local teams, which vary from small amateur/privateer teams to professional teams run by import-associated businesses like Car Sales and Vehicle Rentals and a small group teams from Australia, New Zealand and all across Asia from as far away as India and Japan. Motor vehicle importer Jean-Louis Leyraud is one of the islands most famous athletes and has won the rally three times, competing in the event from the early 1970s through to the late 2000s, winning the New Caledonia championship 11 times.

Since joining the Asia-Pacific championship a number of competitors have claimed multiple victories: Malaysian driver Karamjit Singh, Finnish driver Jussi Välimäki, Japanese driver Katsuhiko Taguchi and most recently Indian driver Gaurav Gill.

List of winners of APRC events
Sourced in part from:

References

External links
Official website

Sport in New Caledonia
Nouvelle-Calédonie
Recurring sporting events established in 1967
Nouvelle Caledonie